Sarcophyton is a genus of flowering plants from the orchid family, Orchidaceae. It has three known species, native to Taiwan and the Philippines:

Sarcophyton crassifolium (Lindl. & Paxton) Garay - Philippines
Sarcophyton pachyphyllum (Ames) Garay - Philippines
Sarcophyton taiwanianum (Hayata) Garay - Taiwan

See also
List of Orchidaceae genera

References

External links

Vandeae genera
Orchids of the Philippines
Orchids of Taiwan
Aeridinae